Bradley First Lutheran Church (also known as Calvary Lutheran Church) is a historic Lutheran church in Bradley, South Dakota.

It was built in 1914 in a Gothic Revival style by Hans Olson and was added to the National Register of Historic Places in 2000.

Roger Zwieg is buried in the cemetery at Calvary Lutheran Church.

References

Lutheran churches in South Dakota
Churches on the National Register of Historic Places in South Dakota
Gothic Revival church buildings in South Dakota
Churches completed in 1914
Churches in Clark County, South Dakota
National Register of Historic Places in Clark County, South Dakota